Oitti railway station is a railway station in the village of Oitti in the municipality of Hausjärvi, Finland.

The Oitti stop is one half of the split operating point of Hausjärvi.

History 
Oitti is one of the original stations of the Riihimäki–Saint Petersburg railway. The class III station of Oitti was finished in 1869, and received further expansions in 1876 and 1917. The arrival of the railway had a sizable impact on the development of the village, and the surroundings of the station became the epicenter of growth in the area.

The Finnish Heritage Agency has declared the Oitti station a protected culture site of national importance.

Services 

Oitti is an intermediate station on commuter rail line  on the route Riihimäki–Lahti. Westbound trains towards Riihimäki stop at track 1 and eastbound ones towards Lahti use track 2. Prior to the opening of the Kerava-Lahti railway line, Oitti was also served by the unnamed regional trains on the route Helsinki–Riihimäki–Lahti–Kouvola–Kotka Harbour.

External links

References 

Hausjärvi
Knut Nylander railway stations
Railway stations opened in 1869
Railway stations in Kanta-Häme